Comparsa is the third studio release by the musical group Deep Forest in January 1998. This album mixes world music and ethnic sounds, including Cuban rhythms, mixed with electronic instruments. After the release of the album Deep Forest arranged a highly successful  world tour. Comparsa became #8 French export album of 1998 and was  certified Platinum by SNEP Export Awards, with more than 500,000 albums sold outside France.

Track listing
 "Noonday Sun" – 4:59
 "Green and Blue" – 4:53
 "Madazulu" – 3:23
 "1716" – 1:03
 "Deep Weather" – 4:54
 "Comparsa" – 4:58
 "Earthquake (Transition 1)" – 0:48
 "Tres Marias"  – 4:53
 "Radio Belize" – 3:58
 "Ekue Ekue" – 5:20
 "La Lune Se Bat Avec Les Étoiles (Transition 2)" – 2:27
 "Forest Power" – 2:47
 "Media Luna" – 4:32
 "Alexi" (Japanese Edition Bonus Track)
 "Freedom Cry" (Japanese Edition Bonus Track)
Bonus Disc:
 "Sweet Lullaby (Remix)"
 "Deep Forest (RLP Trance Mix)"
 "Marta's Song (Armand's Muslim Moose Mix)"
 "Madazulu (BBE Harmonic Club Mix)"

Personnel
Eric Mouquet – arrangement, keyboards, and programmation
Michel Sanchez – arrangement, keyboards, and programmation
Ana Torroja – vocals on "Media Luna"
Jorge Reyes (musician) – percussion, vocals and the flute. (Mexican Musician).
 Joe Zawinul - synthesizer on "Deep Weather"

Reception

References

External links 
 Details, samples and lyrics with translations from Comparsa

1997 albums
Deep Forest albums
550 Music albums